Foreign electoral district of Ukraine — electoral district, which unites electoral precincts, that are situated outside the territory of Ukraine, and which comprises all polling station located inside embassies and consulates of Ukraine and inside military bases abroad, where there are Ukrainian peacekeeping contingents (Kosovo and DR Congo). The responsibilities of district election commission for the Foreign electoral district are carried out by the Central Election Commission. In this district only nationwide votings are held, i.e. presidential and parliamentary elections, as well as nationwide referendums. Local elections are not held there.

Polling station on ships under the flag of Ukraine, which are being deployed in the day of voting, and the polling station at Vernadsky Research Base in Antarctica, despite actually being outside the territory of Ukraine, are included into usual electoral districts on the territory of Ukraine. A polling station on a ship is included in the district where its port of registry is located, and the polling station at the polar station is included in the district #223 (Kyiv, Shevchenkivskyi District) where the headquarters of the National Antarctic Scientific Center of Ukraine are located.

Among diplomatic missions of Ukraine, there are not only embassies and consulates, but also missions to international organizations and honorary consulates, but there are no polling stations in them. Apart from embassies and consulates, there is a polling station at the Branch office of the Embassy of Ukraine in Argentina, which is located in the city of Santiago, Chile.

Any citizen of Ukraine without a criminal record can apply to be a member of precinct election commission in the Foreign electoral district, with exception to candidates and their representatives, governments officials, including staff of diplomatic missions.

In November 2011 the new version of the Law of Ukraine "On Elections of People's Deputies of Ukraine" was adopted, in which the Foreign electoral district was abolished, and all its polling stations abroad were evenly distributed among electoral districts in the city of Kyiv. However, in April 2012 Constitutional Court of Ukraine recognized this innovation unconstitutional on a basis that adding foreign polling stations to electoral districts in Kyiv impedes the full reflection of the will of voters who live in Kyiv, so later the Foreign electoral district was brought back to the law.

Number of voters and their turnout 
As of the day of voting in the first round of 2019 Ukrainian presidential election, there were 552,357 eligible voters (around 1.55% of all eligible voters) in the Foreign electoral district, of them 268 were on the military base in Goma, DR Congo, and 42 on military base in Novo Selo, Kosovo. As of the day of voting of 2019 Ukrainian parliamentary election, there were 102 polling stations in 72 countries of the World, including 5 in Germany, 4 in the United States, Poland and Italy, and 3 in Canada, Spain, Turkey and China. The Consulate-general of Ukraine in Milan is the only place in the Foreign electoral district where there are two polling stations.

The Foreign electoral district differs from usual electoral districts by its pretty low turnout (around 10-15% compared to over 50% on the territory of Ukraine, however voters in countries where there is well organized Ukrainian community show a bit higher turnout), because of enormous areas of voting precincts which make many voters unable to get to the polling station, and even if they do, they have to stand in very long queues to vote. Also, there is an opinion that only a small portion of Ukrainian citizens abroad are included in the lists of voters in Foreign electoral district, due to quite complicated procedure of applying for consular registration and due to many Ukrainians hiding the fact of their staying abroad from Ukrainian authorities. Also, to vote in the Foreign electoral district, a person has to visit an embassy or consulate twice: once to register and once to vote.

Differences from usual electoral districts 
The electoral process on the Foreign electoral district differs from that in the electoral districts on the territory of Ukraine in many ways. Among differences there are:
 Electoral districts on the territory of Ukraine were formed in a way that approximately an equal number of voters resided in each of them. At the moment of formation of today's electoral districts in 2012, the average number of voters in each district was 161,140. Foreign electoral district with its 552,357 voters clearly do not follow this rule.
 During parliamentary elections, voters in each electoral district on the territory of Ukraine not only get a ballot with a list of parties elected nationwide, but also get a ballot with a list of candidates to represent their electoral district in the parliament (Ukraine has a mixed system of voting, where 225 MPs are elected via a nationwide list of parties and 225 are elected one from each electoral district). Voters in Foreign electoral district are only given a ballot with a list of parties.
 Local elections (elections of city, town and village mayors, elections of village, town, city, district and region councils etc.) are not held in the Foreign electoral district.
 The Central Election Commission perform the duties of district election commission in the Foreign electoral district, in particular, appoints members of precinct election commissions, receives protocols of votes count from them and registers the observers.
 Some role in organizing electoral process in the Foreign electoral district is also played by the Ministry of Foreign Affairs, such as taking part in formation of staff of precinct commissions, maintains the list of voters in the Foreign electoral district, transfers voting ballots and other voting documentation from Central commission to precinct ones and vice versa.
 Just as on usual polling stations in Ukraine, foreign polling stations are opened for voters from 8 to 20 o'clock, but according to local time, not the time in Ukraine. The polling station to be opened the earliest is the one at the Embassy of Ukraine in Australia in Canberra. It opens at 23 o'clock of previous day in Ukrainian time. The latest to open is the polling station at the Consulate-general of Ukraine in San Francisco, which opens at 18 o'clock Ukrainian time.
 Unlike the territory of Ukraine, where electoral precincts are never bigger than a hundred square kilometers and in big cities they can be even smaller than a block, in the Foreign electoral district precincts can contain whole countries or sometimes even considerable parts of continents. That creates a lot of trouble for voters abroad.
 In the Foreign electoral district voting at the place of residence (for people who due to health problems are unable to visit a polling station personally) is not carried out because of giant sizes of electoral precincts.
 In polling stations abroad voters should present a travel passport, diplomatic passport or service passport to get a ballot, while in polling station in Ukraine voters should present an identity card.
 While citizens of Ukraine who live in Ukraine are added to lists of voters according to their resident registration, citizens abroad are added to the lists according to the data of consular registration.
 In countries where there is a significant number of Ukrainian citizens, e.g. Poland, Germany, Moldova, USA or Canada, lists of voters can be as large as tens of thousands people (with the biggest list belonging to a polling station at the embassy in Chisinau — over 50 thousand voters). Meanwhile, on the territory of Ukraine a list of voters in every polling station never exceeds 2,500 people.

Abolishment of foreign polling station of Ukraine in Russia 

In 2018 the Central Election Commission, on the submission of the Ministry of Foreign Affairs, decided to close all Ukrainian polling stations on the territory of Russia, namely in the embassy in Moscow and in consulates in Saint-Petersburg, Rostov-na-Donu, Yekaterinburg and Novosibirsk. Voters residing in Russia were moved to the polling stations in neighboring countries. North Caucasian and Southern federal districts of Russia were included into the electoral precinct of the Embassy of Ukraine in Georgia, the rest of European Russia into precinct of Embassy of Ukraine in Finland, Asian Russia into precinct of Embassy of Ukraine in Kazakhstan. That was done due to security reasons. Pavlo Klimkin, then the Minister of foreign affairs, said that there are significant security risks, such as law enforcement, administrative and propaganda pressure on voters and election commissions members, possibility of dangerous provocation, infiltration of special services agents into election commissions, intervention of Russian authorities into elections etc. Minister summarized the position of MFA with such a statement:

This gave rise to Russian media claiming that 2019 Ukrainian presidential election is illegitimate, with arguments that polling stations on the territory of Russia were abolished, and also that Russian observers were denied permission to observe Ukrainian elections.

This decision was challenged in the Supreme Court of Ukraine in January 2019, but the court recognized it legal.

Difficulties with voting abroad 
On 2019 Ukrainian presidential election in Foreign electoral district only 59,830 out of 552,357 registered voters used their right to vote, even when there are approximately 6 million Ukrainian citizens listed in state registers as being abroad. Thus, only about 1% of Ukrainian citizens abroad participate in elections. Many Ukrainians living outside Ukraine hide their being there from the Ukrainian officials, with the biggest reasons being frequent statements by politicians about the possibility of introducing taxation for people working abroad and introducing punishment for dual citizenship, as well as distrust of the Ukrainian authorities in general. Those citizens who do decide to vote must either apply to be included in the list of voters at a polling station abroad or apply to be included in the consular list at a diplomatic establishment of Ukraine, which will also result in inclusion into the list of voters. In both cases, they have to either send the application by mail, together with the Ukrainian passport and the original residence permit, which is deemed risky, or come to the diplomatic establishment in person. The passport of another state as a proof of residence permit in that state is not eligible, since Ukraine does not recognize other citizenships of its citizens. Therefore, citizens of Ukraine who also have a passport of another state can not achieve being added to the voters list, as well as being added the consular list. Attending an embassy or a consulate in person to register for voting or to vote is a problem for many citizens as they often have to travel long distances. For example, a Ukrainian living in Perth has to travel more than 3,000 km to the embassy in Canberra, and a plane ticket across the continent can cost $800 or more. In addition to the financial component, this trip takes one or even several days. This problem is especially acute in countries with few polling stations and large territories or polling stations covering several major countries, such as Brazil, South Africa, Australia, China. During the election day, huge queues appear in front of polling stations in countries where there is a significant presence of Ukrainians, such as Germany, the Czech Republic, the United States, Moldova and Estonia. Due to the low capacity of foreign polling stations, voters have to wait in queue for several hours. Sometimes, it happens that the queue is still there when it is time for the polling station to close, so it has to continue its work for a while. Also, it is often problematic to find people to work in foreign precinct election commissions.

Due to the above-mentioned problems, Ukrainians abroad are actively advocating for electronic voting, at least for foreign voters. Opponents of voting over the Internet say that there will be doubts about the honesty of the votes counting, also there will be no way to make sure that the vote was given freely and personally, that is, what if a person voted under supervision of another person, or even under supervision of the special services of the host country. In addition to that, critics of online voting fear numerous votes from Russia, whose honesty will be questioned. Also, voters living abroad ask to introduce an online consular registration system and allow voting by mail. Along with that, foreign voters are concerned about the lack of polling stations and offer to open them not only at embassies and consulates, but also at honorary consulates of Ukraine or elsewhere. Officials, namely the former Foreign Minister Pavlo Klimkin, point out that the current Ukrainian legislation allows opening polling stations abroad only at embassies and consulates and at military bases, moreover, not all countries would allow opening polling stations outside diplomatic missions. At the same time, Klimkin expressed his full support for the ideas of electronic voting.

Foreign voting in other countries 
There are two main approaches in the World to attribute the votes of citizens abroad to a particular constituency: their votes are collected into one (all over the World) or several (each covers a certain part of foreign territory) foreign constituencies, or their votes are somehow attributed to constituencies located in the territory of their nativeland. A single foreign constituency exists in many countries, for example in Bulgaria or in Croatia. Ukrainian voters abroad can not elect majoritarian MPs, unlike many other countries, such as France, Portugal or Croatia. In some countries, there are not one but several foreign constituencies, each covering only a specific part of foreign territories. For example, in Portugal there are two foreign constituencies: one includes countries in Europe, the other all countries outside Europe. In France, there are 11 foreign constituencies, each comprising several European countries or large parts of other continents. Similar "fragmented" foreign constituencies are also found in Italy and Northern Macedonia.

Another approach is to assign votes of citizens abroad to one or more constituencies (usually in the capital) in the territory of their nativeland. This approach was cancelled in Ukraine by the Constitutional Court in 2012 ⇨. This approach is used in the Netherlands, where citizens abroad are assigned to The Hague constituency (the Hague mayor is responsible for registering voters abroad); in Poland, where citizens abroad are counted into 19th constituency in Warsaw; in Belarus, where foreign votes are attributed to the 95th Kupalov district in Minsk, in which the MFA of Belarus is located; and other countries.

As for the voting itself, depending on the country, citizens either have to personally come to the polling station abroad, or they can vote remotely (by mail or online). Some countries, including Norway and Australia, allow voters who will be abroad on election day, but who will be at home shortly beforehand, to vote in advance. Citizens of those countries that allow voting only in the polling station should visit their country's diplomatic establishment to vote. An exception is Moldova, whose voters can arrange polling stations anywhere, even in the shop, under certain conditions. Ukrainian legislation allows voting abroad to be held only in the diplomatic missions of Ukraine.

Many countries of the World, unlike Ukraine, provide voters with the opportunity to register in voters lists and to vote by mail (paper or electronic) or online. For example, in Estonia you can vote online, and in the United States, depending on the state, voters either receive a paper ballot, fill it out, and send it back, or receive a ballot by email or fax, print it, and send it back, or vote via the Internet. Some countries do not even allow citizens abroad to vote. As an example, Israeli citizens can vote only in Israel. Those citizens who are abroad (except diplomats and employees of some government organizations abroad) are not allowed to vote. The same, except for elections to the European Parliament, also applies to Ireland.

In the United Kingdom, citizens living or temporarily residing abroad are allowed to delegate someone else to vote on their behalf. During elections to the European Parliament, a national of one EU member state residing in another EU member state may vote in the country of stay on the same terms as local citizens. For example, an Irish citizen residing in Spain may participate in the elections as a Spanish voter and vote for a party nominated for the EP by Spain.

Voting results

Presidential elections

Parliamentary elections 
In the Foreign electoral district "pro-European" parties have traditionally had more electoral support than "pro-Russian" ones. For example, in the parliamentary elections of 2012, Svoboda won the most votes, overtaking the Party of Regions by one third of a percent, while the Party of Regions was confidently victorious in the territory of Ukraine, gaining three times as many votes as Svoboda. Another example is the fact that the Communist Party of Ukraine has always received fewer votes in the foreign district than in Ukraine. In 2014, the Opposition Bloc won the overwhelming majority in electoral districts in eastern Ukraine but won only in one electoral precinct in the Foreign electoral district.

List of polling stations and precincts 
Polling stations abroad are located in all embassies and consulates of Ukraine abroad, except embassies and consulates in Russia ⇨, embassies in the Vatican, Indonesia, Iraq, Pakistan, Tajikistan, Angola, Ethiopia, Kenya, Nigeria, Senegal, consulate São Paulo, as well as the embassies in Libya and Syria, which because of ongoing military conflicts, are temporarily situated in Tunisia and Lebanon, respectively.

There are also countries that are not part of any foreign electoral precinct: Iceland, Albania, Bhutan, Laos, North Korea, Papua New Guinea, Haiti, many African countries, including Sierra Leone, Guinea-Bissau, The Gambia, Liberia, Ivory Coast, Burkina Faso, Ghana, Togo, Cameroon, Equatorial Guinea, Congo, DR Congo, Chad, Central African Republic, South Sudan, Uganda, Djibouti, Eritrea and Somalia, as well as the numerous Pacific and Caribbean island states.

Polling stations are also located on military bases where there are Ukrainian peacekeeping contingents. Currently, they are the base of Ukrainian peacekeeping forces in Kosovo and the base of the 18th Separate Helicopter Detachment in the DR Congo. Previously, there was also a polling station at the 56th Separate Helicopter Unit of the United Nations Mission in Liberia (polling station #900113). In addition, in the past, there was another polling station at the 18th Helicopter Detachment (polling station #900112) in Bunia in DRC, simultaneously with the station in Goma, which still exists today.

Electoral precincts by number of voters:

Map 
[{"type": "FeatureCollection", "features": [
 {"type": "Feature", 
  "properties": {"title": "900001", "description": "Embassy of Ukraine to Australia (Canberra)", "marker-symbol": "polling-place", "marker-color": "08f"}, 
  "geometry": {"type": "Point", "coordinates": [149.1271, -35.2759]}},
 {"type": "Feature", 
  "properties": {"title": "900002", "description": "Embassy of Ukraine to Austria (Vienna)", "marker-symbol": "polling-place", "marker-color": "08f"}, 
  "geometry": {"type": "Point", "coordinates": [16.3119, 48.2341]}},
 {"type": "Feature", 
  "properties": {"title": "900003", "description": "Embassy of Ukraine to Azerbaijan (Baku)", "marker-symbol": "polling-place", "marker-color": "08f"}, 
  "geometry": {"type": "Point", "coordinates": [49.8439, 40.4042]}},
 {"type": "Feature", 
  "properties": {"title": "900004", "description": "Embassy of Ukraine to Algeria (Algeria)", "marker-symbol": "polling-place", "marker-color": "08f"}, 
  "geometry": {"type": "Point", "coordinates": [3.0295, 36.7602]}},
 {"type": "Feature", 
  "properties": {"title": "900005", "description": "Embassy of Ukraine to Argentina (Buenos Aires)", "marker-symbol": "polling-place", "marker-color": "08f"}, 
  "geometry": {"type": "Point", "coordinates": [-58.4420, -34.5683]}},
 {"type": "Feature", 
  "properties": {"title": "900006", "description": "Embassy of Ukraine to Belgium (Brussels)", "marker-symbol": "polling-place", "marker-color": "08f"}, 
  "geometry": {"type": "Point", "coordinates": [4.3608, 50.7953]}},
 {"type": "Feature", 
  "properties": {"title": "900007", "description": "Embassy of Ukraine to Belarus (Minsk)", "marker-symbol": "polling-place", "marker-color": "08f"}, 
  "geometry": {"type": "Point", "coordinates": [27.5581, 53.9143]}},
 {"type": "Feature", 
  "properties": {"title": "900009", "description": "Embassy of Ukraine to Bulgaria (Sofia)", "marker-symbol": "polling-place", "marker-color": "08f"}, 
  "geometry": {"type": "Point", "coordinates": [23.2608, 42.6739]}},
 {"type": "Feature", 
  "properties": {"title": "900011", "description": "Embassy of Ukraine to Brazil (Brasília)", "marker-symbol": "polling-place", "marker-color": "08f"}, 
  "geometry": {"type": "Point", "coordinates": [-47.9077, -15.8517]}},
 {"type": "Feature", 
  "properties": {"title": "900012", "description": "Embassy of Ukraine to Vietnam (Hanoi)", "marker-symbol": "polling-place", "marker-color": "08f"}, 
  "geometry": {"type": "Point", "coordinates": [105.8368, 21.0337]}},
 {"type": "Feature", 
  "properties": {"title": "900013", "description": "Embassy of Ukraine to the United Kingdom (London)", "marker-symbol": "polling-place", "marker-color": "08f"}, 
  "geometry": {"type": "Point", "coordinates": [-0.2082, 51.5061]}},
 {"type": "Feature", 
  "properties": {"title": "900015", "description": "Embassy of Ukraine to Armenia (Yerevan)", "marker-symbol": "polling-place", "marker-color": "08f"}, 
  "geometry": {"type": "Point", "coordinates": [44.5136, 40.1986]}},
 {"type": "Feature", 
  "properties": {"title": "900016", "description": "Embassy of Ukraine to Greece (Athens)", "marker-symbol": "polling-place", "marker-color": "08f"}, 
  "geometry": {"type": "Point", "coordinates": [23.7844, 38.0156]}},
 {"type": "Feature", 
  "properties": {"title": "900018", "description": "Embassy of Ukraine to Georgia (Tbilisi)", "marker-symbol": "polling-place", "marker-color": "08f"}, 
  "geometry": {"type": "Point", "coordinates": [44.7423, 41.7097]}},
 {"type": "Feature", 
  "properties": {"title": "900020", "description": "Embassy of Ukraine to Denmark (Copenhagen)", "marker-symbol": "polling-place", "marker-color": "08f"}, 
  "geometry": {"type": "Point", "coordinates": [12.5935, 55.6824]}},
 {"type": "Feature", 
  "properties": {"title": "900021", "description": "Embassy of Ukraine to Estonia (Tallinn)", "marker-symbol": "polling-place", "marker-color": "08f"}, 
  "geometry": {"type": "Point", "coordinates": [24.7840, 59.4398]}},
 {"type": "Feature", 
  "properties": {"title": "900022", "description": "Embassy of Ukraine to Egypt (Cairo)", "marker-symbol": "polling-place", "marker-color": "08f"}, 
  "geometry": {"type": "Point", "coordinates": [31.2664, 29.9592]}},
 {"type": "Feature", 
  "properties": {"title": "900023", "description": "Embassy of Ukraine to Israel (Tel Aviv)", "marker-symbol": "polling-place", "marker-color": "08f"}, 
  "geometry": {"type": "Point", "coordinates": [34.7780, 32.0949]}},
 {"type": "Feature", 
  "properties": {"title": "900025", "description": "Embassy of Ukraine to India (New Delhi)", "marker-symbol": "polling-place", "marker-color": "08f"}, 
  "geometry": {"type": "Point", "coordinates": [77.1582, 28.5659]}},
 {"type": "Feature", 
  "properties": {"title": "900026", "description": "Embassy of Ukraine to Iran (Tehran)", "marker-symbol": "polling-place", "marker-color": "08f"}, 
  "geometry": {"type": "Point", "coordinates": [51.4457, 35.8116]}},
 {"type": "Feature", 
  "properties": {"title": "900027", "description": "Embassy of Ukraine to Ireland (Ireland)", "marker-symbol": "polling-place", "marker-color": "08f"}, 
  "geometry": {"type": "Point", "coordinates": [-6.2364, 53.3306]}},
 {"type": "Feature", 
  "properties": {"title": "900028", "description": "Embassy of Ukraine to Spain (Madrid)", "marker-symbol": "polling-place", "marker-color": "08f"}, 
  "geometry": {"type": "Point", "coordinates": [-3.6371, 40.4555]}},
 {"type": "Feature", 
  "properties": {"title": "900031", "description": "Embassy of Ukraine to Italy (Rome)", "marker-symbol": "polling-place", "marker-color": "08f"}, 
  "geometry": {"type": "Point", "coordinates": [12.4937, 41.9205]}},
 {"type": "Feature", 
  "properties": {"title": "900034", "description": "Embassy of Ukraine to Jordan (Amman)", "marker-symbol": "polling-place", "marker-color": "08f"}, 
  "geometry": {"type": "Point", "coordinates": [35.8575, 31.9518]}},
 {"type": "Feature", 
  "properties": {"title": "900035", "description": "Embassy of Ukraine to Kazakhstan (Astana)", "marker-symbol": "polling-place", "marker-color": "08f"}, 
  "geometry": {"type": "Point", "coordinates": [71.4302, 51.1656]}},
 {"type": "Feature", 
  "properties": {"title": "900037", "description": "Embassy of Ukraine to Canada (Ottawa)", "marker-symbol": "polling-place", "marker-color": "08f"}, 
  "geometry": {"type": "Point", "coordinates": [-75.6925, 45.4168]}},
 {"type": "Feature", 
  "properties": {"title": "900040", "description": "Embassy of Ukraine to Kyrgyzstan (Bishkek)", "marker-symbol": "polling-place", "marker-color": "08f"}, 
  "geometry": {"type": "Point", "coordinates": [74.5829, 42.809]}},
 {"type": "Feature", 
  "properties": {"title": "900041", "description": "Embassy of Ukraine to the PRC (Beijing)", "marker-symbol": "polling-place", "marker-color": "08f"}, 
  "geometry": {"type": "Point", "coordinates": [116.4571, 39.9454]}},
 {"type": "Feature", 
  "properties": {"title": "900043", "description": "Embassy of Ukraine to Cyprus (Nicosia)", "marker-symbol": "polling-place", "marker-color": "08f"}, 
  "geometry": {"type": "Point", "coordinates": [33.3146, 35.156]}},
 {"type": "Feature", 
  "properties": {"title": "900044", "description": "Embassy of Ukraine to South Korea (Seoul)", "marker-symbol": "polling-place", "marker-color": "08f"}, 
  "geometry": {"type": "Point", "coordinates": [126.9993, 37.5358]}},
 {"type": "Feature", 
  "properties": {"title": "900045", "description": "Embassy of Ukraine to Cuba (Havana)", "marker-symbol": "polling-place", "marker-color": "08f"}, 
  "geometry": {"type": "Point", "coordinates": [-82.4315, 23.1146]}},
 {"type": "Feature", 
  "properties": {"title": "900046", "description": "Embassy of Ukraine to Kuwait (Kuwait City)", "marker-symbol": "polling-place", "marker-color": "08f"}, 
  "geometry": {"type": "Point", "coordinates": [47.9964, 29.3194]}},
 {"type": "Feature", 
  "properties": {"title": "900047", "description": "Embassy of Ukraine to Latvia (Riga)", "marker-symbol": "polling-place", "marker-color": "08f"}, 
  "geometry": {"type": "Point", "coordinates": [24.1070, 56.958]}},
 {"type": "Feature", 
  "properties": {"title": "900048", "description": "Embassy of Ukraine to Lithuania (Vilnius)", "marker-symbol": "polling-place", "marker-color": "08f"}, 
  "geometry": {"type": "Point", "coordinates": [25.2739, 54.6808]}},
 {"type": "Feature", 
  "properties": {"title": "900049", "description": "Embassy of Ukraine to Lebanon (Beirut)", "marker-symbol": "polling-place", "marker-color": "08f"}, 
  "geometry": {"type": "Point", "coordinates": [35.5504, 33.8322]}},
 {"type": "Feature", 
  "properties": {"title": "900051", "description": "Embassy of Ukraine to Macedonia (Skopje)", "marker-symbol": "polling-place", "marker-color": "08f"}, 
  "geometry": {"type": "Point", "coordinates": [21.4168, 41.9892]}},
 {"type": "Feature", 
  "properties": {"title": "900052", "description": "Embassy of Ukraine to Malaysia (Kuala Lumpur)", "marker-symbol": "polling-place", "marker-color": "08f"}, 
  "geometry": {"type": "Point", "coordinates": [101.7207, 3.1563]}},
 {"type": "Feature", 
  "properties": {"title": "900053", "description": "Embassy of Ukraine to Morocco (Rabat)", "marker-symbol": "polling-place", "marker-color": "08f"}, 
  "geometry": {"type": "Point", "coordinates": [-6.8305, 33.9927]}},
 {"type": "Feature", 
  "properties": {"title": "900054", "description": "Embassy of Ukraine to Mexico (Mexico City)", "marker-symbol": "polling-place", "marker-color": "08f"}, 
  "geometry": {"type": "Point", "coordinates": [-99.2136, 19.4234]}},
 {"type": "Feature", 
  "properties": {"title": "900055", "description": "Embassy of Ukraine to Moldova (Chișinău)", "marker-symbol": "polling-place", "marker-color": "08f"}, 
  "geometry": {"type": "Point", "coordinates": [28.8107, 47.0219]}},
 {"type": "Feature", 
  "properties": {"title": "900058", "description": "Embassy of Ukraine to The Netherlands (The Hague)", "marker-symbol": "polling-place", "marker-color": "08f"}, 
  "geometry": {"type": "Point", "coordinates": [4.3017, 52.0858]}},
 {"type": "Feature", 
  "properties": {"title": "900059", "description": "Embassy of Ukraine to Germany (Berlin)", "marker-symbol": "polling-place", "marker-color": "08f"}, 
  "geometry": {"type": "Point", "coordinates": [13.3837, 52.5239]}},
 {"type": "Feature", 
  "properties": {"title": "900064", "description": "Embassy of Ukraine to Norway (Oslo)", "marker-symbol": "polling-place", "marker-color": "08f"}, 
  "geometry": {"type": "Point", "coordinates": [10.7271, 59.9146]}},
 {"type": "Feature", 
  "properties": {"title": "900065", "description": "Embassy of Ukraine to the UAE (Abu Dhabi)", "marker-symbol": "polling-place", "marker-color": "08f"}, 
  "geometry": {"type": "Point", "coordinates": [54.3711, 24.4829]}},
 {"type": "Feature", 
  "properties": {"title": "900067", "description": "Embassy of Ukraine to Peru (Lima)", "marker-symbol": "polling-place", "marker-color": "08f"}, 
  "geometry": {"type": "Point", "coordinates": [-77.0534, -12.1076]}},
 {"type": "Feature", 
  "properties": {"title": "900068", "description": "Embassy of Ukraine to South Africa (Pretoria)", "marker-symbol": "polling-place", "marker-color": "08f"}, 
  "geometry": {"type": "Point", "coordinates": [28.2481, -25.7681]}},
 {"type": "Feature", 
  "properties": {"title": "900069", "description": "Embassy of Ukraine to Poland (Warsaw)", "marker-symbol": "polling-place", "marker-color": "08f"}, 
  "geometry": {"type": "Point", "coordinates": [21.0219, 52.215]}},
 {"type": "Feature", 
  "properties": {"title": "900073", "description": "Embassy of Ukraine to Portugal (Lisbon)", "marker-symbol": "polling-place", "marker-color": "08f"}, 
  "geometry": {"type": "Point", "coordinates": [-9.2159, 38.7067]}},
 {"type": "Feature", 
  "properties": {"title": "900080", "description": "Embassy of Ukraine to Romania (Bucharest)", "marker-symbol": "polling-place", "marker-color": "08f"}, 
  "geometry": {"type": "Point", "coordinates": [26.0866, 44.4582]}},
 {"type": "Feature", 
  "properties": {"title": "900082", "description": "Embassy of Ukraine to Saudi Arabia (Riyadh)", "marker-symbol": "polling-place", "marker-color": "08f"}, 
  "geometry": {"type": "Point", "coordinates": [46.6899, 24.7343]}},
 {"type": "Feature", 
  "properties": {"title": "900083", "description": "Embassy of Ukraine to Serbia (Belgrade)", "marker-symbol": "polling-place", "marker-color": "08f"}, 
  "geometry": {"type": "Point", "coordinates": [20.4616, 44.7727]}},
 {"type": "Feature", 
  "properties": {"title": "900085", "description": "Embassy of Ukraine to Singapore (Singapore)", "marker-symbol": "polling-place", "marker-color": "08f"}, 
  "geometry": {"type": "Point", "coordinates": [103.8520, 1.2848]}},
 {"type": "Feature", 
  "properties": {"title": "900086", "description": "Embassy of Ukraine to Slovakia (Bratislava)", "marker-symbol": "polling-place", "marker-color": "08f"}, 
  "geometry": {"type": "Point", "coordinates": [17.0868, 48.1479]}},
 {"type": "Feature", 
  "properties": {"title": "900088", "description": "Embassy of Ukraine to Slovenia (Ljubljana)", "marker-symbol": "polling-place", "marker-color": "08f"}, 
  "geometry": {"type": "Point", "coordinates": [14.5016, 46.0398]}},
 {"type": "Feature", 
  "properties": {"title": "900089", "description": "Embassy of Ukraine to the United States (Washington, D.C.)", "marker-symbol": "polling-place", "marker-color": "08f"}, 
  "geometry": {"type": "Point", "coordinates": [-77.0678, 38.9047]}},
 {"type": "Feature", 
  "properties": {"title": "900093", "description": "Embassy of Ukraine to Thailand (Bangkok)", "marker-symbol": "polling-place", "marker-color": "08f"}, 
  "geometry": {"type": "Point", "coordinates": [100.5481, 13.7393]}},
 {"type": "Feature", 
  "properties": {"title": "900094", "description": "Embassy of Ukraine to Tunisia (Tunis)", "marker-symbol": "polling-place", "marker-color": "08f"}, 
  "geometry": {"type": "Point", "coordinates": [10.1645, 36.836]}},
 {"type": "Feature", 
  "properties": {"title": "900095", "description": "Embassy of Ukraine to Turkey (Ankara)", "marker-symbol": "polling-place", "marker-color": "08f"}, 
  "geometry": {"type": "Point", "coordinates": [32.8650, 39.8725]}},
 {"type": "Feature", 
  "properties": {"title": "900097", "description": "Embassy of Ukraine to Turkmenistan (Ashgabat)", "marker-symbol": "polling-place", "marker-color": "08f"}, 
  "geometry": {"type": "Point", "coordinates": [58.3880, 37.9383]}},
 {"type": "Feature", 
  "properties": {"title": "900098", "description": "Embassy of Ukraine to Hungary (Budapest)", "marker-symbol": "polling-place", "marker-color": "08f"}, 
  "geometry": {"type": "Point", "coordinates": [18.9937, 47.5054]}},
 {"type": "Feature", 
  "properties": {"title": "900100", "description": "Embassy of Ukraine to Uzbekistan (Tashkent)", "marker-symbol": "polling-place", "marker-color": "08f"}, 
  "geometry": {"type": "Point", "coordinates": [69.2871, 41.3072]}},
 {"type": "Feature", 
  "properties": {"title": "900101", "description": "Embassy of Ukraine to Finland (Helsinki)", "marker-symbol": "polling-place", "marker-color": "08f"}, 
  "geometry": {"type": "Point", "coordinates": [25.0171, 60.1855]}},
 {"type": "Feature", 
  "properties": {"title": "900102", "description": "Embassy of Ukraine to France (Paris)", "marker-symbol": "polling-place", "marker-color": "08f"}, 
  "geometry": {"type": "Point", "coordinates": [2.3094, 48.8489]}},
 {"type": "Feature", 
  "properties": {"title": "900104", "description": "Embassy of Ukraine to Croatia (Zagreb)", "marker-symbol": "polling-place", "marker-color": "08f"}, 
  "geometry": {"type": "Point", "coordinates": [15.9903, 45.8175]}},
 {"type": "Feature", 
  "properties": {"title": "900105", "description": "Embassy of Ukraine to the Czech Republic (Prague)", "marker-symbol": "polling-place", "marker-color": "08f"}, 
  "geometry": {"type": "Point", "coordinates": [14.3983, 50.1055]}},
 {"type": "Feature", 
  "properties": {"title": "900107", "description": "Embassy of Ukraine to Montenegro (Podgorica)", "marker-symbol": "polling-place", "marker-color": "08f"}, 
  "geometry": {"type": "Point", "coordinates": [19.2589, 42.4511]}},
 {"type": "Feature", 
  "properties": {"title": "900108", "description": "Embassy of Ukraine to Switzerland (Bern)", "marker-symbol": "polling-place", "marker-color": "08f"}, 
  "geometry": {"type": "Point", "coordinates": [7.4471, 46.9439]}},
 {"type": "Feature", 
  "properties": {"title": "900109", "description": "Embassy of Ukraine to Sweden (Stockholm)", "marker-symbol": "polling-place", "marker-color": "08f"}, 
  "geometry": {"type": "Point", "coordinates": [18.1232, 59.3623]}},
 {"type": "Feature", 
  "properties": {"title": "900110", "description": "Embassy of Ukraine to Japan (Tokyo)", "marker-symbol": "polling-place", "marker-color": "08f"}, 
  "geometry": {"type": "Point", "coordinates": [139.7252, 35.6571]}},
 {"type": "Feature", 
  "properties": {"title": "900120", "description": "Embassy of Ukraine to Qatar (Doha)", "marker-symbol": "polling-place", "marker-color": "08f"}, 
  "geometry": {"type": "Point", "coordinates": [51.5122, 25.3561]}},
 {"type": "Feature", 
  "properties": {"title": "900008", "description": "Consulate of Ukraine in Brest (Belarus)", "marker-symbol": "polling-place", "marker-color": "f80"}, 
  "geometry": {"type": "Point", "coordinates": [23.6808, 52.0879]}},
 {"type": "Feature", 
  "properties": {"title": "900014", "description": "Consulate of Ukraine in Edinburgh (United Kingdom)", "marker-symbol": "polling-place", "marker-color": "f80"}, 
  "geometry": {"type": "Point", "coordinates": [-3.1825, 55.9583]}},
 {"type": "Feature", 
  "properties": {"title": "900017", "description": "Consulate of Ukraine in Thessaloniki (Greece)", "marker-symbol": "polling-place", "marker-color": "f80"}, 
  "geometry": {"type": "Point", "coordinates": [22.9357, 40.6342]}},
 {"type": "Feature", 
  "properties": {"title": "900074", "description": "Consulate of Ukraine in Porto (Portugal)", "marker-symbol": "polling-place", "marker-color": "f80"}, 
  "geometry": {"type": "Point", "coordinates": [-8.6273, 41.1613]}},
 {"type": "Feature", 
  "properties": {"title": "900029", "description": "Consulate General of Ukraine in Barcelona (Spain)", "marker-symbol": "polling-place", "marker-color": "f80"}, 
  "geometry": {"type": "Point", "coordinates": [2.1310, 41.3909]}},
 {"type": "Feature", 
  "properties": {"title": "900030", "description": "Consulate of Ukraine in Málaga (Spain)", "marker-symbol": "polling-place", "marker-color": "f80"}, 
  "geometry": {"type": "Point", "coordinates": [-4.4086, 36.7198]}},
 {"type": "Feature", 
  "properties": {"title": "900032", "description": "Consulate General of Ukraine in Milan (Italy)", "marker-symbol": "polling-place", "marker-color": "f80"}, 
  "geometry": {"type": "Point", "coordinates": [9.13907, 45.4966]}},
 {"type": "Feature", 
  "properties": {"title": "900121", "description": "Consulate General of Ukraine in Milan (Italy)", "marker-symbol": "polling-place", "marker-color": "f80"}, 
  "geometry": {"type": "Point", "coordinates": [9.1391, 45.49645]}},
 {"type": "Feature", 
  "properties": {"title": "900033", "description": "Consulate General of Ukraine in Naples (Italy)", "marker-symbol": "polling-place", "marker-color": "f80"}, 
  "geometry": {"type": "Point", "coordinates": [14.2807, 40.8563]}},
 {"type": "Feature", 
  "properties": {"title": "900038", "description": "Consulate General of Ukraine in Toronto (Canada)", "marker-symbol": "polling-place", "marker-color": "f80"}, 
  "geometry": {"type": "Point", "coordinates": [-79.4852, 43.6196]}},
 {"type": "Feature", 
  "properties": {"title": "900125", "description": "Consulate General of Ukraine in Edmonton (Canada)", "marker-symbol": "polling-place", "marker-color": "f80"}, 
  "geometry": {"type": "Point", "coordinates": [-113.4672, 53.5841]}},
 {"type": "Feature", 
  "properties": {"title": "900042", "description": "Consulate General of Ukraine in Shanghai (PRC)", "marker-symbol": "polling-place", "marker-color": "f80"}, 
  "geometry": {"type": "Point", "coordinates": [121.4026, 31.2057]}},
 {"type": "Feature", 
  "properties": {"title": "900056", "description": "Consulate of Ukraine in Bălți (Moldova)", "marker-symbol": "polling-place", "marker-color": "f80"}, 
  "geometry": {"type": "Point", "coordinates": [27.9305, 47.7693]}},
 {"type": "Feature", 
  "properties": {"title": "900061", "description": "Consulate General of Ukraine in Hamburg (Germany)", "marker-symbol": "polling-place", "marker-color": "f80"}, 
  "geometry": {"type": "Point", "coordinates": [10.0175, 53.5644]}},
 {"type": "Feature", 
  "properties": {"title": "900062", "description": "Consulate General of Ukraine in Munich (Germany)", "marker-symbol": "polling-place", "marker-color": "f80"}, 
  "geometry": {"type": "Point", "coordinates": [11.5565, 48.1346]}},
 {"type": "Feature", 
  "properties": {"title": "900122", "description": "Consulate General of Ukraine in Düsseldorf (Germany)", "marker-symbol": "polling-place", "marker-color": "f80"}, 
  "geometry": {"type": "Point", "coordinates": [6.7908, 51.2226]}},
 {"type": "Feature", 
  "properties": {"title": "900063", "description": "Consulate General of Ukraine in Frankfurt (Germany)", "marker-symbol": "polling-place", "marker-color": "f80"}, 
  "geometry": {"type": "Point", "coordinates": [8.6865, 50.1169]}},
 {"type": "Feature", 
  "properties": {"title": "900116", "description": "Consulate of Ukraine in Dubai (UAE)", "marker-symbol": "polling-place", "marker-color": "f80"}, 
  "geometry": {"type": "Point", "coordinates": [55.2714, 25.2069]}},
 {"type": "Feature", 
  "properties": {"title": "900071", "description": "Consulate General of Ukraine in Krakow (Poland)", "marker-symbol": "polling-place", "marker-color": "f80"}, 
  "geometry": {"type": "Point", "coordinates": [19.9590, 50.0674]}},
 {"type": "Feature", 
  "properties": {"title": "900072", "description": "Consulate General of Ukraine in Lublin (Poland)", "marker-symbol": "polling-place", "marker-color": "f80"}, 
  "geometry": {"type": "Point", "coordinates": [22.5578, 51.2501]}},
 {"type": "Feature", 
  "properties": {"title": "900070", "description": "Consulate of Ukraine in Gdańsk (Poland)", "marker-symbol": "polling-place", "marker-color": "f80"}, 
  "geometry": {"type": "Point", "coordinates": [18.5795, 54.3858]}},
 {"type": "Feature", 
  "properties": {"title": "900090", "description": "Consulate General of Ukraine in New York City (USA)", "marker-symbol": "polling-place", "marker-color": "f80"}, 
  "geometry": {"type": "Point", "coordinates": [-73.9698, 40.7544]}},
 {"type": "Feature", 
  "properties": {"title": "900091", "description": "Consulate General of Ukraine in San Francisco (USA)", "marker-symbol": "polling-place", "marker-color": "f80"}, 
  "geometry": {"type": "Point", "coordinates": [-122.4060, 37.7909]}},
 {"type": "Feature", 
  "properties": {"title": "900092", "description": "Consulate General of Ukraine in Chicago (USA)", "marker-symbol": "polling-place", "marker-color": "f80"}, 
  "geometry": {"type": "Point", "coordinates": [-87.6276, 41.8951]}},
 {"type": "Feature", 
  "properties": {"title": "900096", "description": "Consulate General of Ukraine in Istanbul (Turkey)", "marker-symbol": "polling-place", "marker-color": "f80"}, 
  "geometry": {"type": "Point", "coordinates": [28.7999, 40.9698]}},
 {"type": "Feature", 
  "properties": {"title": "900099", "description": "Consulate of Ukraine in Nyíregyháza (Hungary)", "marker-symbol": "polling-place", "marker-color": "f80"}, 
  "geometry": {"type": "Point", "coordinates": [21.7288, 47.9844]}},
 {"type": "Feature", 
  "properties": {"title": "900106", "description": "Consulate of Ukraine in Brno (Czech Republic)", "marker-symbol": "polling-place", "marker-color": "f80"}, 
  "geometry": {"type": "Point", "coordinates": [16.5785, 49.198]}},
 {"type": "Feature", 
  "properties": {"title": "900124", "description": "Consulate of Ukraine in Antalya (Turkey)", "marker-symbol": "polling-place", "marker-color": "f80"}, 
  "geometry": {"type": "Point", "coordinates": [30.7178, 36.8868]}},
 {"type": "Feature", 
  "properties": {"title": "900126", "description": "Consulate General of Ukraine in Guangzhou (PRC)", "marker-symbol": "polling-place", "marker-color": "f80"}, 
  "geometry": {"type": "Point", "coordinates": [113.3248, 23.1423]}},
 {"type": "Feature", 
  "properties": {"title": "900123", "description": "Division of the Embassy of Ukraine to Argentina in Chile (Santiago de Chile)", "marker-symbol": "polling-place", "marker-color": "f88"}, 
  "geometry": {"type": "Point", "coordinates": [-70.5344, -33.402]}},
 {"type": "Feature", 
  "properties": {"title": "900111", "description": "Military base in Goma (DR Congo)", "marker-symbol": "polling-place", "marker-color": "080"}, 
  "geometry": {"type": "Point", "coordinates": [29.24, -1.656]}},
 {"type": "Feature", 
  "properties": {"title": "900114", "description": "Military base in Novo Selo (Serbia)", "marker-symbol": "polling-place", "marker-color": "080"}, 
  "geometry": {"type": "Point", "coordinates": [21.033, 42.786]}}
]}]

Polling stations at:
  Embassies
  Consulates
  Divisions of embassies
  Military bases

See also 
 Electoral districts of Ukraine
 Ukrainian diaspora
 Central Election Commission (Ukraine)
 Ministry of Foreign Affairs (Ukraine)
 List of diplomatic missions of Ukraine
 Elections in Ukraine
 Election commission

References 

 State documents

 Voting results

 Laws

 Sources from other countries

External links 
 Law of Ukraine «On elections of the President of Ukraine» — website of Verkhovna Rada (archive)
 Law of Ukraine «On Elections of People's Deputies of Ukraine» — website of Verkhovna Rada (archive)
 Foreign electoral precincts  — website of State voters register
 Foreign electoral precincts established on a permanent basis — website of the Ministry of Foreign Affairs of Ukraine (archive)
 Elections results by polling stations — dekoder
 For the notice of Ukrainian citizens! 2019 elections. Voting abroad. — сwebsite of the Ministry of Foreign Affairs of Ukraine

Electoral districts of Ukraine
Elections in Ukraine
Ukrainian diaspora
Expatriate voting